The 2015 World RX of France was the ninth round of the second season of the FIA World Rallycross Championship. The event was held at the Circuit de Lohéac in Lohéac, Bretagne during 5–6 September 2015.

Heats

Semi-finals

Semi-final 1

Semi-final 2

Final

Championship standings after the event

References

External links

|- style="text-align:center"
|width="35%"|Previous race:2015 World RX of Norway
|width="30%"|FIA World Rallycross Championship2015 season
|width="35%"|Next race:2015 World RX of Barcelona
|- style="text-align:center"
|width="35%"|Previous race:2014 World RX of France
|width="30%"|World RX of France
|width="35%"|Next race:2016 World RX of France
|- style="text-align:center"

France
World RX